Tayloria nepalensis is an extant dung moss species found in Nepal. It was first described by Zennoske Iwatsuki and William Campbell Steere in 1975.

References

Splachnales
Flora of Nepal
Plants described in 1975